Frederick R. Dudley (born November 8, 1944) is an American politician in the state of Florida.

Dudley was born in Fort Myers and is an attorney. He served in the Florida House of Representatives for the 74th district from 1982 to 1986, as a Republican. He served in the Florida Senate from 1986 until 1998, when he ran for Florida Attorney General. He became a Florida Bar Certified Construction Lawyer in 2005, and practiced law in Tallahassee, specializing in representing applicants for contractor licenses, and in disciplinary proceedings.

References

1944 births
Living people
Republican Party members of the Florida House of Representatives
Republican Party Florida state senators